Ankhisalla  is a village development committee in the Shahidbhumi Rural Municipality of Dhankuta District in the Province No. 1 of eastern Nepal. At the time of the 1991 Nepal census it had a population of 5220 people living in 923 individual households. The Chulung language is spoken in Ankhisalla.

References

Populated places in Dhankuta District